Fraunhoferstraße is an U-Bahn station in Munich on the U1 and U2. It is also served by route  of the Munich tramway.

References

Munich U-Bahn stations
Railway stations in Germany opened in 1980
1980 establishments in West Germany